Mahdism in the Twelver branch of Shia Islam, derived from the belief in the reappearance of the Twelfth Shiite Imam, Muhammad al-Mahdi as the savior of the apocalypse for the salvation of human beings and the establishment of peace and justice. Mahdism is a kind of messianism. From this perspective, it is believed that Jesus Christ and Khidr are still alive and will emerge with Muhammad al-Mahdi in order to fulfil their mission of bringing peace and justice to the world.

Mahdism in Quran
Many verses of the Quran are related to the Mahdism. Like verse 105 of Al-Anbiya Surah:

The commentators have considered the fulfillment of the promise mentioned in the verse at the time of the reappearance of Imam Muhammad al-Mahdi. Also, verse 5 of Al-Qasas Surah:

Some have considered the interpretations of this verse to be related to Muhammad al-Mahdi and others have considered it to be related to the return (Rajʽa) of the Imams and the return of the government to them. Verse 55 of Surah An-Nur:

Also it is known to be related to Mahdism issues. Some have considered the fulfillment of the promise mentioned in the verse at the time of the reappearance of  Twelfth Imam, Muhammad al-Mahdi and some have considered the community mentioned in the verse to be achievable only at the time of the reappearance of Muhammad al-Mahdi.

Mahdism in Twelver branch
The Shiites of the Twelver branch of Shia Islam believe that according to the divine promise, a person from the descendants of the Muhammad, Prophet of Islam and namesake with him, the ninth child of the descendants of Husayn ibn Ali, will appear with the epithet of "Mahdi" and will spread justice throughout the earth.

According to this belief, Mahdi, the son of Hasan al-Askari (the eleventh Shiite Imam), was born in 870 CE, upon the death of his father, while still a child, after the early years of his Imamate disappeared and would only contact his followers through his four successive deputies. The period so-called minor occultation or first occultation, in which Mahdi was not in direct contact with the people, only through his special deputies, which was mostly in contact with the Shiites. According to official tradition, in 940 CE, the fourth and last delegate received a final letter signed by the hidden Imam in which he declared that henceforth and "until the end of time," no one will see him or be his representative, and that whosoever declares otherwise is no less than an imposter. Thus a long absence began, so-called major occultation or second occultation.

Some late Shiite scholars questioning and rejecting Mahdism; Such as: Abolfazl Borqei Qomi, Heidar Ali Qalmadaran Qomi, Mohammad Hassan Shariat Sanglaji.

Among the present scholars who have worked on Mahdism issue is Lotfollah Safi Golpaygani. He has two important works in this field (Selected Trace About the Twelfth Imam and Imamate and Mahdism).

Mahdism in other Shiite branches
One of the events that spread the idea of the Mahdism was the sudden death of Ismail, the son of Ja'far al-Sadiq (the sixth Imam of the Shiites), in 762 CE, who, according to the Isma'ilism Shiites, had previously been appointed as the seventh Imam of the Shiites. Although most Shiites gathered around Ja'far al-Sadiq's other son, Musa al-Kadhim, a minority of Shiites did not accept Ismail's death, claiming that Ismail was still alive and hide himself by absence. According to them, Ismail is the absent Imam. With the rise of the Fatimid Caliphate in Egypt, the epithet of "Mahdi" was attributed to the first Fatimid caliph and his successors, citing hadiths narrated by the Isma'ilists and other sources. Howbeit, the Isma'ilists expect the seventh Isma'ili Imam to appear under the name of Qa'im at the end of time.

In the Zaidi Shi'ism sect, who do not consider the Imams to have superhuman powers, belief in the Mahdism is very inconspicuous. Throughout history, many people have been considered as "Mahdi" or claimed to be alive and absent. One of them was Husayn ibn Qasim Ayani, the leader of a sect branching out from Zaidi Shi'ism, called "Husaynieh sect". A group denied his death and claimed him as "Mahdi" and believed that he would return. But this beliefs about these people is not recognized by the Zaidi Shi'ism majority.

Mahdism in Sunni branch
According to Reza Aslan, with the development of the Mahdism doctrine among the Shiites, Sunni jurisprudence scholars tried to distance themselves from the belief in the "Mahdi". According to Wilferd Madelung, despite the support of the belief in the Mahdi by some important Sunni traditionist, the belief in the Mahdi has never been considered as "the main beliefs of Sunni jurisprudence". The Mahdi is mentioned in Sunni beliefs, but rarely. Many prominent Sunni scholars, such as Al-Ghazali, have avoided discussing this issue. Of course, according to Madelung, this avoidance was less due to disbelief in the Mahdi and more (according to Reza Aslan) due to avoid disputes and social riots.

There are exceptions such as Ibn Khaldun in the book "Muqaddimah" who openly opposes the belief in the Mahdi and considers all hadiths related to the Mahdi to be fabricated. There are different views among the traditionist and scholars who have dealt with the Mahdism issue. The epithet of "Mahdi" has been mentioned many times in the book "Musnad" by Ahmad ibn Hanbal (founder of the Hanbali school of Sunni jurisprudence — one of the four major orthodox legal schools of Sunni Islam — also he is one of the four Sunni Imams) and various hadiths about the signs of the reappearance of the "Promised Mehdi" (and Jesus in his cooperation) mentioned there. Ahmad ibn Hanbal has narrated in his work that:

In mentioning the importance and validity of Ahmad ibn Hanbal's "Musnad" among the Sunnis, it is enough that Taqi al-Din al-Subki writes on page 201 of the first volume of "Tabaqat al-Shafeiyah":

Also Al-Suyuti, a Sunni Egyptian Muslim scholar, has mentioned about validity of Ahmad ibn Hanbal among Sunnis in the introduction part of the book "Jam al-Javameh" and Ali ibn Abd-al-Malik al-Hindi, the author of Kanz al-Ummal, says in it:

In some hadiths in Sunni books, "Mahdi" is the same "Jesus Christ", in other narrations there is no mention of "the identity of that person", or it is said that "he rises with Jesus." Also mentioned "Mahdi" as one of the descendants of Husayn ibn Ali, the descendants of Hasan ibn Ali or the son of Hasan al-Askari, the twelfth Imam of Shiites. Throughout history to the present day, there have been long debates among Sunni scholars about the "savior" role and the "political" role of the Mahdi.

But according to Seyyed Hossein Nasr, the Sunnis believe that the Mahdi is from the family of the Prophet of Islam named "Muhammad" and will emerge with Jesus in the end times. He also writes that the belief in the coming of the Mahdi is so strong among Muslims that throughout history, especially in times of pressure and hardship, has led to the emergence of claimants of "Mahdism". Contemporary Sunni writers such as Abd al-Muhsin al-Ibad, Muhammad Ali al-Sabuni, and Abd al-Aziz ibn Baz have also referred to the hadiths attributed to the Prophet of Islam about the Mahdi and the "savior of the end times" in their books and speeches, and have considered these hadiths trusty because mentioned numerously by different narrators.

According to Denise Spellberg, the concept of "Mahdism", although not one of the main Sunni beliefs, has been considered by Sunnis throughout history. In 1881, Muhammad Ahmad claimed to be the Mahdi in Sudan and started an uprising that was suppressed in 1898 by British forces. Belief in Mahdism spurred uprisings in the west and north of Africa in the nineteenth century. In 1849, a person named Bo Zian led an uprising in Algeria against the French tax system and the occupation of his country by the French under the name of Mahdi.

Political Mahdism
Abdolkarim Soroush is one of the few thinkers who has analyzed the relationship between Mahdism and politics and presented a new perspective of Mahdism. He believes that political Mahdism has historically manifested itself in politics in at least four ways:

 The theory of Guardianship of the Islamic Jurist: The theory of Guardianship of the Islamic Jurist, which is incompatible with democracy, is the child of political Mahdism. Political Mahdism justifies the special privileges of Faqīhs for government in the theory of Guardianship of the Islamic Jurist. Political Mahdism, based on the theory of Guardianship of the Islamic Jurist, presupposes the "supreme Faqīh" as the deputy of Muhammad al-Mahdi and gives the same authority to the "supreme Faqīh" in power and possession of the properties of the Muslims population, that the absent Imam has.
 The theory of monarchy on behalf of the Imam of the Safavid kings: Another form of political Mahdism throughout history that Abdolkarim Soroush refers to has been the theory of "monarchy on behalf of the Imam of the Safavid kings." This theory was in fact the political theory of the Safavids. This theory is also clearly in conflict with democracy.
 Hojjatieh's theory of political impracticality: Another form of political Mahdism mentioned by Abdolkarim Soroush is the theory of political impracticality during the absence and condemn all the governments before the emerge of the "Imam of Time" as usurper. Throughout history, many Shiite Faqīh have advocated this theory, and before the Islamic Revolution, this view was propagated by the Hojjatieh Association.
 The theory of revolutionary Islam or the "Waiting, a protest school": According to Abdolkarim Soroush, another form of Mahdism that is not very compatible with democracy is the theory of "Waiting, a protest school" by Dr. Ali Shariati. Shariati appears in the article "Waiting, a protest school" as a utopian and historian who believes in the determinism of history, who has a pragmatic approach to waiting for Mahdism to change the current status and achieve his desired utopia.

See also

 Occultation (Islam)
 Second Coming

References

External links
 Dictionary - definition of Mahdism
 Definition of Mahdist - followers of al-Mahdī
 Mahdism and Islamism in Sudan
 Millenarianism and Mahdism in Lebanon
 Mahdism: Islamic Messianism and the Belief in The Coming of the Universal Savior
 From Mahdism to Neo-Mahdism in the Sudan
 Islam: The Doctrine of Mahdism

 
Hujjat Allah al-Mahdi
Imams
Islamic eschatology
Islamic terminology
Twelve Imams